The Kuwait cricket team toured Qatar in July 2019 to play a three-match Twenty20 International (T20I) series. This was the first bilateral T20I series for both sides. The series formed part of both teams' preparation for the Asian Regional Qualifying Finals tournament for the 2019 ICC T20 World Cup Qualifier. All of the matches were played at the West End Park International Cricket Stadium in Doha. Kuwait won the opening match  by seven wickets, before the second match was decided by a Super Over which was won by Qatar, after the game was tied. Qatar won the final match by three wickets to win the series 2–1.

Squads

T20I series

1st T20I

2nd T20I

3rd T20I

References

External links
 Series home at ESPN Cricinfo

Associate international cricket competitions in 2019